A scientist is a person who researches to advance knowledge in an area of the natural sciences. 

In classical antiquity, there was no real ancient analog of a modern scientist. Instead, philosophers engaged in the philosophical study of nature called natural philosophy, a precursor of natural science. Though Thales (circa 624–545 BC) was arguably the first scientist for describing how cosmic events may be seen as natural, not necessarily caused by gods, it was not until the 19th century that the term scientist came into regular use after it was coined by the theologian, philosopher, and historian of science William Whewell in 1833.

History

The roles of "scientists", and their predecessors before the emergence of modern scientific disciplines, have evolved considerably over time. Scientists of different eras (and before them, natural philosophers, mathematicians, natural historians, natural theologians, engineers, and others who contributed to the development of science) have had widely different places in society, and the social norms, ethical values, and epistemic virtues associated with scientists—and expected of them—have changed over time as well. Accordingly, many different historical figures can be identified as early scientists, depending on which characteristics of modern science are taken to be essential.

Some historians point to the Scientific Revolution that began in 16th century as the period when science in a recognizably modern form developed. It wasn't until the 19th century that sufficient socioeconomic changes had occurred for scientists to emerge as a major profession.

Classical antiquity
Knowledge about nature in classical antiquity was pursued by many kinds of scholars. Greek contributions to science—including works of geometry and mathematical astronomy, early accounts of biological processes and catalogs of plants and animals, and theories of knowledge and learning—were produced by philosophers and physicians, as well as practitioners of various trades. These roles, and their associations with scientific knowledge, spread with the Roman Empire and, with the spread of Christianity, became closely linked to religious institutions in most of European countries. Astrology and astronomy became an important area of knowledge, and the role of astronomer/astrologer developed with the support of political and religious patronage. By the time of the medieval university system, knowledge was divided into the trivium—philosophy, including natural philosophy—and the quadrivium—mathematics, including astronomy. Hence, the medieval analogs of scientists were often either philosophers or mathematicians. Knowledge of plants and animals was broadly the province of physicians.

Middle Ages
Science in medieval Islam generated some new modes of developing natural knowledge, although still within the bounds of existing social roles such as philosopher and mathematician. Many proto-scientists from the Islamic Golden Age are considered polymaths, in part because of the lack of anything corresponding to modern scientific disciplines. Many of these early polymaths were also religious priests and theologians: for example, Alhazen and al-Biruni were mutakallimiin; the physician Avicenna was a hafiz; the physician Ibn al-Nafis was a hafiz, muhaddith and ulema; the botanist Otto Brunfels was a theologian and historian of Protestantism; the astronomer and physician Nicolaus Copernicus was a priest. During the Italian Renaissance scientists like Leonardo da Vinci, Michelangelo, Galileo Galilei and Gerolamo Cardano have been considered as the most recognizable polymaths.

Renaissance
During the Renaissance, Italians made substantial contributions in science. Leonardo da Vinci made significant discoveries in paleontology and anatomy. The Father of modern Science,
Galileo Galilei, made key improvements on the thermometer and telescope which allowed him to observe and clearly describe the solar system. Descartes was not only a pioneer of analytic geometry but formulated a theory of mechanics and advanced ideas about the origins of animal movement and perception. Vision interested the physicists Young and Helmholtz, who also studied optics, hearing and music. Newton extended Descartes's mathematics by inventing calculus (at the same time as Leibniz). He provided a comprehensive formulation of classical mechanics and investigated light and optics. Fourier founded a new branch of mathematics — infinite, periodic series — studied heat flow and infrared radiation, and discovered the greenhouse effect. Girolamo Cardano, Blaise Pascal Pierre de Fermat, Von Neumann, Turing, Khinchin, Markov and Wiener, all mathematicians, made major contributions to science and probability theory, including the ideas behind computers, and some of the foundations of statistical mechanics and quantum mechanics. Many mathematically inclined scientists, including Galileo, were also musicians.

There are many compelling stories in medicine and biology, such as the development of ideas about the circulation of blood from Galen to Harvey. Some scholars and historians attributes Christianity to having contributed to the rise of the Scientific Revolution.

Age of Enlightenment
During the age of Enlightenment, Luigi Galvani, the pioneer of the bioelectromagnetics, discovered the animal electricity. He discovered that a charge applied to the spinal cord of a frog could generate muscular spasms throughout its body. Charges could make frog legs jump even if the legs were no longer attached to a frog. While cutting a frog leg, Galvani's steel scalpel touched a brass hook that was holding the leg in place. The leg twitched. Further experiments confirmed this effect, and Galvani was convinced that he was seeing the effects of what he called animal electricity, the life force within the muscles of the frog. At the University of Pavia, Galvani's colleague Alessandro Volta was able to reproduce the results, but was sceptical of Galvani's explanation.

Lazzaro Spallanzani is one of the most influential figures in experimental physiology and the natural sciences. His investigations have exerted a lasting influence on the medical sciences. He made important contributions to the experimental study of bodily functions and animal reproduction.

Francesco Redi discovered that microorganisms can cause disease.

19th century
Until the late 19th or early 20th century, scientists were still referred to as "natural philosophers" or "men of science".

English philosopher and historian of science William Whewell coined the term scientist in 1833, and it first appeared in print in Whewell's anonymous 1834 review of Mary Somerville's On the Connexion of the Physical Sciences published in the Quarterly Review. Whewell wrote of "an increasing proclivity of separation and dismemberment" in the sciences; while highly specific terms proliferated—chemist, mathematician, naturalist—the broad term "philosopher" was no longer satisfactory to group together those who pursued science, without the caveats of "natural" or "experimental" philosopher. Whewell compared these increasing divisions with Somerville's aim of "[rendering] a most important service to science" "by showing how detached branches have, in the history of science, united by the discovery of general principles." Whewell reported in his review that members of the British Association for the Advancement of Science had been complaining at recent meetings about the lack of a good term for "students of the knowledge of the material world collectively." Alluding to himself, he noted that "some ingenious gentleman proposed that, by analogy with artist, they might form [the word] scientist, and added that there could be no scruple in making free with this term since we already have such words as economist, and atheist—but this was not generally palatable".

Whewell proposed the word again more seriously (and not anonymously) in his 1840 The Philosophy of the Inductive Sciences:

He also proposed the term physicist at the same time, as a counterpart to the French word physicien. Neither term gained wide acceptance until decades later; scientist became a common term in the late 19th century in the United States and around the turn of the 20th century in Great Britain. By the twentieth century, the modern notion of science as a special brand of information about the world, practiced by a distinct group and pursued through a unique method, was essentially in place.

20th century
Marie Curie became the first female to win the Nobel Prize and the first person to win it twice. Her efforts led to the development of nuclear energy and Radiotherapy for the treatment of cancer. In 1922, she was appointed a member of the International Commission on Intellectual Co-operation by the Council of the League of Nations. She campaigned for scientist's right to patent their discoveries and inventions. She also campaigned for free access to international scientific literature and for internationally recognized scientific symbols.

Profession
As a profession, the scientist of today is widely recognized. However, there is no formal process to determine who is a scientist and who is not a scientist. Anyone can be a scientist in some sense. Some professions have legal requirements for their practice (e.g. licensure) and some scientists are independent scientists meaning that they practice science on their own, but to practice science there are no known licensure requirements.

Education
In modern times, many professional scientists are trained in an academic setting (e.g., universities and research institutes), mostly at the level of graduate schools. Upon completion, they would normally attain an academic degree, with the highest degree being a doctorate such as a Doctor of Philosophy (PhD). Although graduate education for scientists varies among institutions and countries, some common training requirements include specializing in an area of interest, publishing research findings in peer-reviewed scientific journals and presenting them at scientific conferences, giving lectures or teaching, and defending a thesis (or dissertation) during an oral examination. To aid them in this endeavor, graduate students often work under the guidance of a mentor, usually a senior scientist, which may continue after the completion of their doctorates whereby they work as postdoctoral researchers.

Career
After the completion of their training, many scientists pursue careers in a variety of work settings and conditions. In 2017, the British scientific journal Nature published the results of a large-scale survey of more than 5,700 doctoral students worldwide, asking them which sectors of the economy they would like to work in. A little over half of the respondents wanted to pursue a career in academia, with smaller proportions hoping to work in industry, government, and nonprofit environments.

Other motivations are recognition by their peers and prestige. The Nobel Prize, a widely regarded prestigious award, is awarded annually to those who have achieved scientific advances in the fields of medicine, physics, and chemistry.

Some scientists have a desire to apply scientific knowledge for the benefit of people's health, the nations, the world, nature, or industries (academic scientist and industrial scientist). Scientists tend to be less motivated by direct financial reward for their work than other careers. As a result, scientific researchers often accept lower average salaries when compared with many other professions which require a similar amount of training and qualification.

Research interests
Scientists include experimentalists who mainly perform experiments to test hypotheses, and theoreticians who mainly develop models to explain existing data and predict new results. There is a continuum between two activities and the division between them is not clear-cut, with many scientists performing both tasks.

Those considering science as a career often look to the frontiers. These include cosmology and biology, especially molecular biology and the human genome project. Other areas of active research include the exploration of matter at the scale of elementary particles as described by high-energy physics, and materials science, which seeks to discover and design new materials. Others choose to study brain function and neurotransmitters, which is considered by many to be the "final frontier". There are many important discoveries to make regarding the nature of the mind and human thought as much still remains unknown.

By specialization

Natural science

Physical science

Life science

Social science

Formal science

Applied

Interdisciplinary

By employer
 Academic
 Independent scientist
 Industrial/applied scientist
 Citizen scientist
 Government scientist

Demography

By country 
The number of scientists is vastly different from country to country. For instance, there are only four full-time scientists per 10,000 workers in India, while this number is 79 for the United Kingdom, and 85 for the United States.

United States 
According to the National Science Foundation, 4.7 million people with science degrees worked in the United States in 2015, across all disciplines and employment sectors. The figure included twice as many men as women. Of that total, 17% worked in academia, that is, at universities and undergraduate institutions, and men held 53% of those positions. 5% of scientists worked for the federal government, and about 3.5% were self-employed. Of the latter two groups, two-thirds were men. 59% of scientists in the United States were employed in industry or business, and another 6% worked in non-profit positions.

By gender 

Scientist and engineering statistics are usually intertwined, but they indicate that women enter the field far less than men, though this gap is narrowing. The number of science and engineering doctorates awarded to women rose from a mere 7 percent in 1970 to 34 percent in 1985 and in engineering alone the numbers of bachelor's degrees awarded to women rose from only 385 in 1975 to more than 11000 in 1985.

See also
 Engineers
 Inventor
 Researcher
 Fields Medal
 Hippocratic Oath for Scientists
 History of science
 Intellectual
 Independent scientist
 Licensure
 Mad scientist
 Natural science
 Nobel Prize
 Protoscience
 Normative science
 Pseudoscience
 Scholar
 Science
 Social science

 Related lists
 List of engineers
 List of mathematicians
 List of Nobel laureates in Physics
 List of Nobel laureates in Chemistry
 List of Nobel laureates in Physiology or Medicine
 List of Russian scientists
 List of Roman Catholic cleric-scientists

References

External articles
 Further reading
 Alison Gopnik, "Finding Our Inner Scientist", Daedalus, Winter 2004.
 Charles George Herbermann, The Catholic Encyclopedia. Science and the Church. The Encyclopedia press, 1913. v.13. Page 598.
 Thomas Kuhn, The Structure of Scientific Revolutions, 1962.
 Arthur Jack Meadows. The Victorian Scientist: The Growth of a Profession, 2004. .
 Science, The Relation of Pure Science to Industrial Research. American Association for the Advancement of Science. Page 511 onwards.

 Websites
 For best results, add a little inspiration – The Telegraph about What Inspired You?, a survey of key thinkers in science, technology and medicine
 Peer Review Journal Science on amateur scientists
 The philosophy of the inductive sciences, founded upon their history (1847) – Complete Text

 Audio-Visual
 "The Scientist", BBC Radio 4 discussion with John Gribbin, Patricia Fara and Hugh Pennington (In Our Time, Oct. 24, 2002)